John Buddle Blyth (1814 – 24 December 1871) was a Jamaican-born chemist who was the first professor of chemistry at Queen's College Cork in Ireland. With August Wilhelm von Hofmann, he was the first to report photopolymerisation which they observed when styrene became metastyrol after exposure to sunlight.

Early life and family
John Blyth was born in Jamaica in 1814 to John Blythe and Mary Buddle, a "free woman of colour". He was baptised at Mesopotamia in Westmoreland Parish on 11 April 1816 by Edmund Pope, rector of Westmorland, and described as a "free child of colour". He had brothers Charles (1817) and Henry (c.1831).

Blyth's parents are not thought to have been married, however, his father left his assets to Mary Buddle in his will and his father obtained the money to buy the Kendal plantation from Mary's father John Buddle indicating that the Buddles had wealth.

He was educated at Dumfries in Scotland and then at the University of Glasgow where he obtained a degree in arts. He received his MD from the University of Edinburgh in 1839 for a thesis titled "The Dependence of the Animal and Organic Functions on Nervous Influence; and the Identity of the Latter with Electricity".

He married Jessie Dunbar in Applegarth, Scotland, in 1847.

Career

Blyth studied at the University of Giessen in Germany and spent six months in Berlin. In the 1840s, Blyth and the German chemist August Wilhelm von Hofmann were the first to report photopolymerisation when they observed that styrene became metastyrol when exposed to sunlight but remained unchanged in the dark.

He was professor of chemistry at the Royal Agricultural College in Cirencester, England, from 1847 to 1848 and in 1849 he was the first professor of chemistry at Queen's College Cork in Ireland.

He translated works by the German chemist Justus von Liebig, of whom he had been a student at Giessen, into English. These included the second volume of the seventh edition of von Liebig's work on agricultural chemistry which was published in New York in 1863 as The Natural Laws of Husbandry. This work included a translation of the introduction to the first volume, the original version of which was considered so controversial for its critique of British farming that it prevented that volume being published in English.

Death
Blyth died on 24 December 1871 at Parkview Terrace, Cork, and was buried at Blackrock in that city. Probate was granted to his wife Jessie. He left less than £2,000. (Approximately £250,000 in 2020)

Selected publications

 Von Liebig, Justus. (1859) Letters on Modern Agriculture. London: Walton & Maberley. (translator)
 Von Liebig, Justus. (1863) The Natural Laws of Husbandry. New York: Appleton. (translator)

References

1814 births
1871 deaths
Jamaican chemists
Academics of Queens College Cork
Migrants from British Jamaica to the United Kingdom
Alumni of the University of Edinburgh
German–English translators
Alumni of the University of Glasgow
People from Westmoreland Parish
Academics of the Royal Agricultural University
19th-century translators
Linguists from Jamaica